Rabbi Moshe Mordechai Soloveitchik, also known as the Swiss Gadol, was a prominent Haredi rabbi who lived in Switzerland. He served as a rosh yeshiva in Lugano and Lucerne before moving to Zurich, where he was recognized as one of the leaders of European Jewry.

Early life 

Rabbi Soloveitchik was born on September 21, 1914 (the second day of Rosh Hashanah), to Rabbi Yisrael Gershon and Chaya Miriam Soloveitchik. His father was the son of Rabbi Chaim Soloveitchik of Brisk. Growing up in Brisk, Moshe was friends with Aharon Leib Shteinman (who years later would be recognized as the Gadol Hador). They both attended Yeshivas Toras Chesed of Brisk, which was led by Rabbi Moshe Sokolovski , author of the Imrei Moshe. After  Sokolovski passed away in 1931 without any children, a dispute erupted in the yeshiva over who should succeed him. Moshe and Aharon Leib both left the yeshiva at that point because of the internal strife, Aharon Leib to Yeshivas Eitz Chaim in Kletsk and Moshe to Yeshivas Knesses Beis Yitzchak in Kamyanyets.

Escape to Switzerland 

Among the yeshiva students, there was a threat of being drafted into the Polish army, although many were exempted as they were too weak to fight. However, both Moshe and Aharon Leib were called to report to the army, and they tried hard to obtain exemptions, eating and drinking little to weaken them and taking long walks to help them lose weight. While their efforts postponed the draft, they were put on a waiting list for the future if more troops were needed. To escape this possibility, in 1937, the two went to Montreaux, Switzerland, Aharon Leib first and Moshe a few months after, where they joined the yeshiva of Rabbi Eliyahu Botchko as teachers. Aryeh Leib Glickson, Moshe's cousin (his mother Sara was the only daughter of Rabbi Chaim Soloveitchik), joined the yeshiva as well a short time after, as he too was avoiding the draft.

In 1940, the Swiss government, suspecting them of espionage, interred 300 Jewish refugees in a resort-turned-labor camp near Basel called Schonburg, where they were forced to lay railroad tracks. Moshe and Aharon Leib were among the 40 Orthodox Jews in this group. They studied together from memory, with one reciting a passage of Gemara and the other responding with the corresponding commentary of Tosafos. They did however have one volume of Mishne Torah in their possession.

Lomza Yeshiva 

At some point, Moshe was discharged from the labor camp and soon traveled to Mandatory Palestine and joined the Lomza Yeshiva of Rabbi Yechiel Mordechai Gordon in Petah Tikvah. During his years there, he built a relationship with Rabbi Avraham Yeshaya Karelitz, (the Chazon Ish).

In 1948/1949, Moshe returned to Switzerland where he married the daughter of Rabbi Shmuel Zanvil Neuman of Lugano.

Rabbinic career 

After his marriage, Rabbi Soloveitchik settled in Lugano where he became a Rosh yeshiva. Several years later, he moved to Lucerne and established a yeshiva there where he tried to instill in his students a commitment to Torah and Yiras Shamayim (fear of Heaven).

In 1963, he moved to Zurich where he didn't accept any official position, although he became recognized as one of the leaders of Europe's Haredi community. Throughout the day and night, people came to him with their questions. After the dissolution of the Soviet Union, he worked to establish Yeshivat Torat Chaim in Moscow  to bring unaffiliated Jews back to Judaism (this is known as kiruv).

On May 18, 1995, after several months of illness, Rabbi Soloveitchik died in Zurich at the age of 80, and he was buried in Jerusalem.

Family tree

See also 
Rabbi Aharon Leib Shteinman
Rabbi Dov Koppelman
Rabbi Meshulam Dovid Soloveitchik

References 

Soloveitchik rabbinic dynasty
Swiss Ashkenazi Jews
Swiss Orthodox rabbis
Haredi rosh yeshivas
Haredi rabbis in Europe
Rabbis from Brest, Belarus
Polish emigrants to Switzerland
1914 births
1955 deaths